Marsh antelope may refer to several species of Antelope:
 Waterbuck
 Kob
 Puku
 Lechwe
 Southern Reedbuck
 Mountain Reedbuck 
 Bohor Reedbuck

Animal common name disambiguation pages